The 1993 Indonesian Women's Open Tennis Championships was a women's tennis tournament played on outdoor hard courts at the Gelora Senayan Stadium in Jakarta, Indonesia and was part of Tier IV of the 1993 WTA Tour. It was the inaugural edition of the tournament and was held from 26 April through 2 May 1993. First-seeded Yayuk Basuki won the singles title and earned $18,000 first-prize money.

Finals

Singles

 Yayuk Basuki defeated  Ann Grossman 6–4, 6–4
 It was Basuki's 2nd singles title of the year and the 4th and last of her career.

Doubles

 Nicole Arendt /  Kristine Radford defeated  Amy deLone /  Erika deLone 6–3, 6–4
 It was Arendt's first doubles title her career. It was Radford's first doubles title of her career.

References

External links
 ITF tournament edition details
 Tournament draws

Indonesian Women's Open Tennis Championships
Danamon Open
Indonesian Women's Open Tennis Championships
Indonesian Women's Open Tennis Championships
Indonesian Women's Open Tennis Championships